Canada competed at the 1972 Summer Olympics in Munich, West Germany, held from 26 August to 11 September 1972. 208 competitors, 158 men and 50 women, took part in 136 events in 18 sports. As the country hosted the next Olympics in Montreal, the Canadian flag was raised at the closing ceremony.

Medalists
Canada finished in 27th position in the final medal rankings, with two silver medals and three bronze medals.

Silver
 Bruce Robertson – Swimming, men's 100m Butterfly
 Leslie Cliff – Swimming, women's 400m Individual Medley

Bronze
 Donna Gurr – Swimming, women's 200m Backstroke
 Erik Fish, William Mahony, Bruce Robertson, and Robert Kasting – Swimming, men's 4 × 100 m Medley Relay
 David Miller, John Ekels, and Paul Cote – Sailing, Soling class

Archery

In the first modern archery competition at the Olympics, Canada entered three men and three women. Their highest placing competitor was Donald Jackson, who finished in 6th place in the men's competition. His score was only 30 points below the bronze medal score.

Men's individual competition:
 Donald Jackson – 2437 points (→ 6th place)
 Elmer Ewert – 2359 points (→ 25th place)
 Wayne Pullen – 2275 points (→ 41st place)

Women's individual competition:
 Mary Grant – 2350 points (→ 11th place)
 Marjory Saunders – 2192 points (→ 32nd place)
 Viola Muir – 1955 points (→ 39th place)

Athletics

Men's 1,500 metres
Kenneth Elmer
 Heat – 3:46.6 (→ did not advance)
Bill Smart
 Heat – 3:49.2 (→ did not advance)

Men's 5,000 metres
Robert Finlay
 Heat – 13:44.0 (→ did not advance)
Grant McLaren
 Heat – 13:43.8 (→ did not advance)

Men's high jump
John Beers
 Qualifying Round – 2.15m
 Final – 2.15m (→ 6th place)
John Hawkins
 Qualifying Round – 2.15m
 Final – 2.15m (→ 9th place)
Richard Cuttell
 Qualification Round – 2.09m (→ did not advance)

Boxing

Men's flyweight (– 51 kg)
 Chris Ius
 First round – bye
 Second round – defeated Ali Ouabbou (MAR), 3:2
 Third Round – lost to Georgi Kostadinov (BUL), 0:5

Men's bantamweight (– 54 kg)
 Les Hamilton
 First round – lost to Stefan Förster (GDR), 1:4

Men's featherweight (– 57 kg)
 Dale Anderson

Men's lightweight (– 60 kg)
 José Martinez

Men's Heavyweight (+ 81 kg)
 Carroll Morgan
 First round – defeated Fatai Ayinla (NGA), 3:2
 Quarterfinals – lost to Hasse Thomsén (SWE), KO-3

Canoeing

Cycling

Nine cyclists represented Canada in 1972.

Individual road race
 Brian Chewter – 52nd place
 Tom Morris – 62nd place
 Gilles Durand – 72nd place
 Lindsay Gauld – did not finish (→ no ranking)

Team time trial
 Gilles Durand
 Brian Chewter
 Jack McCullough
 Tom Morris

Sprint
 Ed McRae

1000m time trial
 Jocelyn Lovell
 Final – 1:09.03 (→ 15th place)

Individual pursuit
 Ron Hayman

Individual pursuit
 Jocelyn Lovell
 Brian Keast
 Ron Hayman
 Ed McRae

Diving

Men's 3m springboard
 Scott Cranham – 339.21 points (→ 14th place)
 Ken Sully – 336.12 points (→ 16th place)
 Ron Friesen – 313.11 points (→ 25th place)

Men's 10m platform
 Ron Friesen – 272.94 points (→ 20th place)
 Scott Cranham – 263.52 points (→ 27th place)
 Ken Sully – 262.26 points (→ 29th place)

Women's 3m springboard
 Beverly Boys – 418.89 points (→ 5th place)
 Teri York – 247.14 points (→ 19th place)
 Elizabeth Carruthers – 243.84 (→ 20th place)

Women's 10m platform
 Nancy Robertson – 334.02 points (→ 7th place)
 Kathleen Rollo – 317.31 points (→ 9th place)
 Beverly Boys – 183.99 points (→ 14th place)

Equestrian

Fencing

Six fencers, five men and one woman, represented Canada in 1972.

Men's foil
 Herbert Obst
 Magdy Conyd
 Lester Wong

Men's team foil
 Magdy Conyd, Herbert Obst, Gerry Wiedel, Lester Wong

Men's épée
 Gerry Wiedel
 Lester Wong
 Herbert Obst

Men's team épée
 Magdy Conyd, Herbert Obst, Gerry Wiedel, Lester Wong

Men's sabre
 Bob Foxcroft

Women's foil
 Donna Hennyey

Gymnastics

Judo

Modern pentathlon

Three male pentathletes represented Canada in 1972. It was the first time Canada had entered pentathletes at the Olympics, and the team was coached by Hungarian-born Joseph Bucsko (1930–1996).

Individual:
 Scott Scheuermann – 4072 points (→ 54th place)
 Kenneth Maaten – 3987 points (→ 56th place)
 George Skene – 3297 points (→ 59th place)

Team:
 Scheuermann, Maaten, and Skene – 11335 points (→ 19th place)

Rowing

Men's coxed pair
Trevor Josephson, Mike Neary and Glenn Battersby
Heat – 7:49.54
Repechage – 8:12.69
Semi-finals – 8:28.62
B-Final – 8:00.27 (→ 9th place)

Sailing

Shooting

Ten male shooters represented Canada in 1972.

25 m pistol
 Jules Sobrian
 William Hare

50 m pistol
 Edward Jans
 Jules Sobrian

50 m rifle, three positions
 Alf Mayer
 Arne Sorensen

50 m rifle, prone
 Alf Mayer
 Gil Boa

Trap
 John Primrose
 James Platz

Skeet
 Bruno De Costa
 Donald Sanderlin

Swimming

Men's 100m freestyle
Brian Phillips
 Heat – 53.75s
 Semifinals – 53.73s (→ did not advance)
Robert Kasting
 Heat – 54.07s
 Semifinals – 53.62s (→ did not advance)
Bruce Robertson
 Heat – 54.76s (→  did not advance)

Men's 200m freestyle
Ralph Hutton
 Heat – 1:56.84
 Final – 1:57.56 (→  8th place)
Bruce Robertson
 Heat – 1:59.02 (→  did not advance)
Ian MacKenzie
 Heat – 2:01.22 (→  did not advance)

Men's 4 × 100 m freestyle Relay
Brian Phillips, Bruce Robertson, Tim Bach, and Robert Kasting
 Heat – 3:35.64
Bruce Robertson, Brian Phillips, Tim Bach, and Robert Kasting
 Final – 3:33.20 (→ 5th place)

Men's 4 × 200 m freestyle Relay
Ralph Hutton, Deane Buckboro, Ian MacKenzie and Brian Phillips
 Heat – 7:57.69
Bruce Robertson, Brian Phillips, Ian MacKenzie, and Ralph Hutton
 Final – 7:53.61 (→ 7th place)

Water polo

Men's team competition
Preliminary round (group A)
 Lost to Yugoslavia (4-12)
 Lost to Mexico (3-7)
 Lost to United States (1-8)
 Lost to Romania (4-16)
 Lost to Cuba (2-7) → did not advance
 Team roster
 William van der Pol
 Allan Pyle
 Patrick Pugliese
 Clifford Barry
 Donald Packer
 Stephen Hart
 Jack Gauldie
 Robert Thompson
 David Hart
 Gabor Csepregi
 Guy Leclerc

Weightlifting

Wrestling

References

Nations at the 1972 Summer Olympics
1972 Summer Olympics
Summer Olympics